The 2008–09 Top League was the sixth season of Japan's domestic rugby union competition, the Top League. The Toshiba Brave Lupus defeated Sanyo Wild Knights by 17–6 in the final of the Microsoft Cup to claim the 2008–09 Top League championship.

The Top League is a semi-professional competition which is at the top of the national league system in Japan, with promotion and relegation between the next level down.

Preseason
Kintetsu Liners returned to the league, and Yokogawa Denki were promoted for the first time (and renamed Yokogawa Musashino Atlastars in the off season). They replaced Ricoh Black Rams and Mitsubishi Sagamihara DynaBoars.

Teams

Regular season

Final standings

Fixtures and results

Title play-offs 
Top 4 sides of the regular season competed in the Microsoft Cup (2009)  knock out tournament to fight for the Top League title. The top 4 teams of 2008–09 were Toshiba Brave Lupus, Sanyo Wild Knights, Kobe Steelers and Suntory Sungoliath.

Semi-finals

Final

Top League Challenge Series

Honda Heat and Ricoh Black Rams won promotion to the 2009–10 Top League via the 2009 Top League Challenge Series, while Mazda Blue Zoomers and Toyota Industries Shuttles progressed to the promotion play-offs.

Promotion and relegation play-offs
Two promotion/relegation matches (Irekaesen) were played with the winners qualifying for the Top League in the next season. The 12th-placed team from the Top League against the 3rd-placed team from Challenge 1. The 11th-placed team from the Top League against the 1st-placed team from Challenge 2.

So Sanix and Kyuden stayed in the Top League for the following season.

Top 10 points scorers

Table notes
 Pts = Points scored
 T = Tries
 C = Conversions
 PG = Penalty Goals
 DG = Drop Goals

End-of-season awards

Best fifteen

Table Notes
 PR = Prop
 HO = Hooker
 LO = Lock
 FL = Flanker
 SH = Scrum Half
 SO = Stand Off
 CTB = Centre Three Quarter Back
 WTB = Wing THree Quarter Back
 FB = Full back

References

External links
 Team Profiles (Japanese)
 Top League official site (Japanese)
 Final Table (Japanese)

Japan Rugby League One
1